Oliva maculata is a species of sea snail, a marine gastropod mollusk in the family Olividae, the olives.

Distribution
This marine species occurs off Zanzibar, the Philippines and in Oceania and Polynesia.

References

 Chenu, 1845 - Parts 46. In Illustrations Conchyliologiques ou description et figures de toutes les coquilles connues vivantes et fossiles, classées suivant le système de Lamarck modifié d'après les progrès de la science et comprenant les genres nouveaux et les espèces récemment découvertes, p. Tridacna pl; 6-8 ; Oliva pl 14-16
 Tursch, B. & Greifeneder, D., 2001 - Oliva shells. The genus Oliva and the species problem, p. 569 pp
 Vervaet F.L.J. (2018). The living Olividae species as described by Pierre-Louis Duclos. Vita Malacologica. 17: 1-111.

External links
 Duclos, P. L. (1835-1840). Histoire naturelle générale et particulière de tous les genres de coquilles univalves marines a l'état vivant et fossile publiée par monographie. Genre Olive. Paris: Institut de France. 33 plates: pls 1-12
 MNHN, Paris: lectotype

maculata
Gastropods described in 1840